Beauval is the name of a communes of France:
 Beauval, Somme, in the Somme département
a town in Canada
 Beauval, Saskatchewan, in Saskatchewan province
and a Canadian Indian Residential School
Beauval Indian Residential School